Chewing Pine is the last album on the Capitol label by American guitarist Leo Kottke, released in 1975. It peaked at #114 on the Billboard Pop Albums charts. "Power Failure" was originally recorded by Procol Harum, a band Kottke toured with in Europe in the 1970s.

It was re-issued on CD by BGO (CD148) in 1992 and One Way Records (18461) in 1996.

Reception

Writing for Allmusic, music critic Bruce Eder wrote of the album "a dazzling amalgam of sounds and styles — there's a surprising emphasis on vocal numbers here... The obvious attempt on Chewing Pine to sell Kottke as more of a mainstream artist and a sometime singer obviously didn't work... There are enough good moments, and even a few transcendent ones, to justify owning this album."

Track listing
All songs by Leo Kottke unless noted.

Side One
 "Standing on the Outside" (Leo Kottke, Mary Kottke) – 2:35
 "Power Failure" (Gary Brooker, Keith Reid) – 2:24
 "Venezuela, There You Go" – 3:08
 "Don't You Think" (Marty Robbins) – 3:34
 "Regards From Chuck Pink" – 2:56

Side Two
 "Monkey Money" – 1:45
 "The Scarlatti Rip-Off" – 3:33
 "Wheels" (Norman Petty) – 1:47
 "Grim to the Brim" – 3:13
 "Rebecca" (Richard Crandell) – 2:48
 "Trombone" – 2:12
 "Can't Quite Put it Into Words" – 3:21

Personnel
Leo Kottke – 6 & 12-string guitar, vocals
Bill Berg – drums, percussion
Bill Peterson – bass
Bill Barber – piano
Jack Smith – organ on "Don’t You Think"

Production notes
Produced by Denny Bruce
Engineer: Paul Martinson
Mastering Engineer: Bob Berglund
Technical Assistance: Tom Mudge and David Pelletier
Art Direction: Roy Kohara
Photography: Tom Berthiaume

References

External links
 Leo Kottke's official site
 Unofficial Leo Kottke web site (fan site)
The Capitol Years

1975 albums
Leo Kottke albums
Capitol Records albums
Albums produced by Denny Bruce